Home government may refer to:
 Home Government Association, political party in pre-partition Ireland
 Douglas-Home ministry, the British government led by Sir Alec Douglas-Home from 1963 to 1964

See also
 Ministry of home affairs